Catharine may refer to:

 Catharine (given name)

In geography:

 Catharine, New York
 St. Catharine, Missouri
 Saint Catharine, Kentucky
 Catharine, Illinois
 Catharine, Kansas
 St. Catharines, Ontario

See also
Catherina (and similar spellings)